Michael Elliott (born ) is a Welsh former rugby union, and professional rugby league footballer who played in the 1960s and 1970s who played for Oldham as a three-quarter back. He is an Oldham Hall Of Fame Inductee.

Playing career

County Cup Final appearances
Mike Elliott played , i.e. number 2, in Oldham's defeat by St. Helens in the 1968 Lancashire County Cup Final during the 1968–69 season at Central Park, Wigan on Friday 25 October 1968.

References

External links
Search for "Elliott" at rugbyleagueproject.org
Profile at www.orl-heritagetrust.org.uk
Statistics at orl-heritagetrust.org.uk

1945 births
Living people
Oldham R.L.F.C. players
Rugby league players from Cardiff
Rugby league centres
Rugby league wingers
Welsh rugby league players